Old Mission is an unincorporated community in Grand Traverse County in the U.S. state of Michigan.  It is located within Peninsula Township near the tip of Old Mission Peninsula along the shores of the East Arm of Grand Traverse Bay.  As an unincorporated community, Old Mission has no legally defined boundaries or population statistics of its own.

History
In the Treaty of Washington in 1836, the federal government agreed to provide local native tribes with both a mission and schools for their reservation. Henry Schoolcraft, the Indian agent representing the government, selected a natural harbor on the eastern shore of the peninsula in Grand Traverse Bay for the planned facilities. In 1838, the Presbyterian Board of Missions, sent the Reverend Peter Dougherty (1805–1894) to establish the mission, now known as Old Mission, for which the peninsula would eventually become known.

The Dougherty Mission House, also known as the Rushmore House and Inn, was built within the community in 1842.  The house and surrounding structures currently serve as a museum.  The Old Mission Inn, built is 1887, is also a historic structure within Old Mission.  The two are listed on the National Register of Historic Places and as Michigan State Historic Sites.   

The area received its first post office on April 26, 1850 under the name Old Mission.  The post office remains in operation and is located at 4007 Swaney Road.  Currently, the post office uses the 49673 ZIP Code, which is used for post office box only and has no delivery.  The area is served by the Traverse City 49686 ZIP Code.

Geography
The community was built along Old Mission Harbor, which is a small safe haven along the East Arm of Grand Traverse Bay.

The community is located within an American Viticultural Area and a center of the Michigan wine industry, including the Old Mission Peninsula AVA.  Mission Point Light is located slightly north at the northern terminus of M-37.  The 45th parallel is slightly north of Old Mission.

Climate

Education
The area is served by Traverse City Area Public Schools, with high school students in Old Mission zoned to Traverse City Central High School.  There are no public schools located on Old Mission Peninsula.

Images

Further reading
Potter, Elizabeth V. The Story of Old Mission. (Ann Arbor, MI: Edward Brothers, 1956).

References

Unincorporated communities in Michigan
Unincorporated communities in Grand Traverse County, Michigan
Traverse City micropolitan area
Populated places established in 1838
1838 establishments in Michigan
Michigan populated places on Lake Michigan